The Hapee Fresh Fighters was a basketball team owned by Lamoiyan Corporation that played in the PBA Developmental League (PBA D-League).

The franchise began in the Philippine Basketball League from 1994 until the league became dormant in 2010. The franchise was revived in 2014 when it took over the franchise of the NLEX Road Warriors in the PBA D-League. The team has forged a school tie-up with San Beda College for its participation in the PBA D-League.

Final roster

Notable players

 Rich Alvarez
 Mark Borboran
 Jayson Castro
 Larry Fonacier
 Caloy Garcia
 Reed Juntilla
 Gabe Norwood
 Larry Rodriguez
 Enrico Villanueva
 Cyrus Baguio
 Gec Chia
 Peter June Simon
 Jervy Cruz 
 Gabby Espinas
 LA Tenorio
 John Ferriols
 Beau Belga
 Chris Tiu
 JVee Casio
 Francis Mercado
 Joel Dualan
 Eugene Tan
 Jesus Ramon Pido
 Leo Austria
 Ronilo Padilla
 Erwin Framo
 Frechie Ang
 Jovie Sese
 Aldrich Jareño
 Biboy Simon
 JC Intal
 Chris Newsome
 Troy Rosario
 Baser Amer
 Arthur dela Cruz
 Ola Adeogun
 Arnold Van Opstal
 Bobby Ray Parks Jr.
 Garvo Lanete
 Ma Jian

Notes

References

External links
Lamoiyan Corp. website

PBA Developmental League teams
Philippine Basketball League teams
Basketball teams established in 1994
1994 establishments in the Philippines
Basketball teams disestablished in 2015
2015 disestablishments in the Philippines